Foel Grach is a mountain in the Carneddau range. It is the eighth-highest summit in Snowdonia as well as Wales, and is included in the Welsh 3000s.

It is located on a broad ridge extending northwards from Carnedd Llewelyn to Carnedd Gwenllian (formerly Y Garnedd Uchaf) and Foel-fras. An emergency refuge has been built below the summit. Compared to the surrounding mountains, much deeper snow settles here due to its rather broad summit and high grassy slopes.  On clear days the Isle of Man and even the Mourne Mountains in Northern Ireland can be seen from the summit.

References

External links
www.geograph.co.uk : photos of Foel Grach

Hewitts of Wales
Tourism in Gwynedd
Mountains and hills of Snowdonia
Nuttalls
Furths
Mountains and hills of Gwynedd
Mountains and hills of Conwy County Borough
Caerhun
Llanllechid